Itzel Reza (born May 29, 1979) is a Mexican sprint canoer who competed in the mid-1990s. She was eliminated in the semifinals of the K-4 500 m event at the 1996 Summer Olympics in Atlanta.

References
Sports-Reference.com profile

1979 births
Canoeists at the 1996 Summer Olympics
Living people
Mexican female canoeists
Olympic canoeists of Mexico
Place of birth missing (living people)
20th-century Mexican women